Mushrif Mall is one of the newest malls in Abu Dhabi, UAE. Located in the city of Abu Dhabi, on Rashid bin Saeed and Al Dafra Streets. This mall is owned by Lulu Group International.

Facilities
The 180,000 square metre mall, was constructed at a cost of UAE Dirham 1.2 billion ( 326.7 million). The supermarkets in the mall house a huge fresh produce market measuring 25,000 sq metres, with stalls for fish, meat, fruit and vegetables.

References

Tourist attractions in Abu Dhabi
Shopping malls in Abu Dhabi
Shopping malls established in 2014
2014 establishments in the United Arab Emirates